The PMR grenade launcher is a muzzle-fired grenade launcher of Transnistrian origin. The device is inserted on the muzzles of AKS-74U rifles.

References 

Grenade launchers